Television in Qatar is very much state-influenced and operated. Official Qatar TV began producing and transmitting its own programmes in 1970, with colour transmission since 1974. It had a monopoly on television audience until 1993, when Qatar Cablevision began broadcasting satellite channels. Since then, four other platforms went on air: ART/1st NET, Orbit, Star Select and Gulf DTH/Showtime. Despite the broadening of television offerings, Qatar TV remains popular among Qataris.

As of 2009, the state owns and operates all broadcast media, and there are only two television networks in the country: Qatar TV and Al Jazeera. Qatar TV broadcasts mostly official news from a pro-government perspective, while Al Jazeera focuses its coverage on international and regional topics.  

Penetration of pay-TV is significantly high at close to 83% in 2011. There are 15 free-to-air channels headquartered in Qatar, of which 13 are state-owned. The state-run Qatar General Broadcasting and Television Corporation operates two domestic channels and the Qatar Satellite channel. Most prominent channels include those related to the Al Jazeera Media Network.

References

 
Television stations